The 1986 United States Senate election in Alabama took place on November 4, 1986 alongside other elections to the United States Senate in other states as well as elections to the United States House of Representatives and various state and local elections. Incumbent Republican U.S. Senator Jeremiah Denton ran for a second term, but was narrowly defeated by Democratic U.S. Representative Richard Shelby by around 7,000 votes.

Republican primary

Candidates
Jeremiah Denton, incumbent Senator since 1981
Richard Vickers

Results
Incumbent Senator Jeremiah Denton, a retired Rear Admiral and decorated Vietnam War veteran who six years earlier became the first Republican elected to the Senate from Alabama since Reconstruction, won the primary with little opposition.

Democratic primary
Shelby, a moderate-to-conservative Democrat narrowly avoided a runoff and won nomination in the Democratic Party primary.

Candidates
 Jim Allen, Jr., son of former U.S. Senator Jim Allen
 Steve Arnold
 Ted McLaughlin
 Richard Shelby, U.S. Representative from Tuscaloosa since 1979
 Margaret Stewart, writer

Results

General election
Shelby won a very narrow victory of less than one percent over Denton.

Candidates
 Jeremiah Denton (R), incumbent U.S. Senator
 Richard Shelby (D), U.S. Representative

Results

See also 
 1986 United States Senate elections

References 

1986 Alabama elections
1986
Alabama